Northeast is a compass point.

Northeast, north-east, north east, northeastern or north-eastern or north eastern may also refer to:
 Northeast (direction), an intercardinal direction

Places

Africa 
 North East (Nigeria)
 North Eastern Province (Kenya)
 North-East District (Botswana)
 North East Region (Ghana)
 North Eastern District, Eritrea

Asia and Oceania 
 Northeast India or the Seven Sister States
 North East Delhi, a district of Delhi
 North Eastern Province, Sri Lanka
 Northeast China or Manchuria
 North Eastern (General Electors Communal Constituency, Fiji), an electoral division of Fiji
 North-East Region, Singapore
 North East Community Development Council, Singapore
 Northeast Province (IMCRA region), an Australian marine biogeographic province
 Northeast (Vietnam)
 Tōhoku region or "Northeast Region", Japan

United Kingdom 
 North East (London Assembly constituency), a constituency of the London Assembly
 North East (London sub region), a sub-region of the London Plan
 North East England, one of the official government regions of England
 North East Scotland (Scottish Parliament electoral region), an electoral region, but in wider use to refer to the area made up of Aberdeen, Aberdeenshire and Moray
 North East (Dundee ward), Scotland
 North East (Glasgow ward), Scotland

America 
 North East, Maryland
 North East, New York
 North East, Pennsylvania
 Northeast, Minneapolis (sometimes referred to as Nordeast)
 Northeast Region, Brazil, an official grouping of states for economic and statistical purposes
 Atlantic Northeast, a region of North America
 Northeast, Washington, D.C., the northeast quadrant of Washington, D.C.
 Northeastern United States
 Northeast Community, a neighborhood in Tampa, Florida
 Northeast (Billings), a section of Billings, Montana

People
 Sam Northeast (born 1989), English cricketer

Airlines 
 Northeast Airlines, a now defunct US airline which began operations in 1931 and merged with Delta Air Lines 1972
 Northeast Airlines (UK), a now defunct British airline which began operations in 1951 as BKS and was merged into British Airways in 1976
 Northeast Airlines (China), a planned start-up airline to be based in Shenyang, People's Republic of China
 Northeast Express Regional Airlines, a now defunct Maine-based regional airline which operated as an affiliate of Northwest Airlines

Sports 
 NorthEast United FC, football team based in Guwahati, Assam, India which competes in Indian Super League 
 Northeastern Warriors, badminton team based in Guwahati, Assam, India which competes in Premier Badminton League 
 North East Re-Organising Cultural Association FC, football club based in Imphal, Manipur, India which competes in I-League 
 North East Tigers, boxing team which competes in Super Boxing League (India)
 Northeastern Huskies, are athletic teams representing Northeastern University in Boston, Massachusetts, United States

Other uses 
 Northeast (film), a 2005 Argentine film
 North East (film),a 2016 Nigerian romantic drama film
 North East Island (disambiguation)
 Northeastern University, a university in Boston, Massachusetts, USA
 Northeastern University (disambiguation)
 Northeastern Conference, a high school athletic conference in Massachusetts
 Northeastern Limited, named passenger train of the Illinois Central, from Shreveport, Louisiana to Meridian, Mississippi.

See also 
 Nord-Est (disambiguation), French for northeast
 Nor'easter, a storm
 Nord-Ost, a Russian musical theatre production
 
 
 

Orientation (geometry)

fr:Nord-Est
pam:Pangulu-aslagan
pt:Nordeste (desambiguação)
fi:Koillinen
vo:North East
war:Dumagsaan
zh:东北